The Tour de San Luis was a road cycling race that was held in San Luis Province, Argentina from 2007 to 2016. The race consisted of a competition over an individual time trial, and six stages. The competition carried a UCI rating of 2.1, and is part of the UCI America Tour, which is one of five UCI Continental Circuits sponsored by the Union Cycliste Internationale, the sport's international governing body.

Past winners

References

External links
  
 2010 start list
 2011 start list
 2012 start list
 2013 start list
 2014 start list
 2015 start list
 2016 start list
 2017 Tour de San Luis cancelled

 
UCI America Tour races
Cycle races in Argentina
Sport in San Luis Province
Recurring sporting events established in 2007
2007 establishments in Argentina